

Peerage of England

|Duke of Cornwall (1337)||none||1422||1453||
|-
|Duke of York (1385)||Richard of York, 3rd Duke of York||1426||1460||
|-
|Duke of Norfolk (1397)||John de Mowbray, 3rd Duke of Norfolk||1432||1461||
|-
|Duke of Gloucester (1414)||Humphrey of Lancaster, 1st Duke of Gloucester||1414||1447||Died, title extinct
|-
|rowspan="2"|Duke of Exeter (1443)||John Holland, 2nd Duke of Exeter||1443||1447||
|-
|Henry Holland, 3rd Duke of Exeter||1447||1461||
|-
|Duke of Somerset (1443)||John Beaufort, 1st Duke of Somerset||1443||1444||New creation, also Earl of Kendal; Died, title extinct
|-
|Duke of Buckingham (1444)||Humphrey Stafford, 1st Duke of Buckingham||1444||1460||New creation
|-
|Duke of Warwick (1445)||Henry de Beauchamp, 1st Duke of Warwick||1445||1446||New creation for the 14th Earl of Warwick; Died, title extinct
|-
|Duke of Somerset (1448)||Edmund Beaufort, 1st Duke of Somerset||1448||1455||New creation; also Marquess of Dorset (1442) and Earl of Dorset (1441)
|-
|Duke of Suffolk (1448)||William de la Pole, 1st Duke of Suffolk||1448||1450||New creation; also Marquess of Suffolk (1444)
|-
|rowspan="3"|Earl of Warwick (1088)||Henry de Beauchamp, 14th Earl of Warwick||1401||1439||See Duke of Warwick above
|-
|Anne de Beauchamp, 15th Countess of Warwick||1446||1448||Died
|-
|Anne Neville, 16th Countess of Warwick and Richard Neville, 16th Earl of Warwick||14481449||14921471||
|-
|Earl of Arundel (1138)||William FitzAlan, 16th Earl of Arundel||1438||1487||
|-
|Earl of Oxford (1142)||John de Vere, 12th Earl of Oxford||1417||1462||
|-
|Earl of Devon (1335)||Thomas de Courtenay, 5th Earl of Devon||1422||1458||
|-
|Earl of Salisbury (1337)||Alice Montacute, 5th Countess of Salisbury and Richard Neville, 5th Earl of Salisbury||14281442||14621460||
|-
|Earl of Stafford (1351)||Humphrey Stafford, 6th Earl of Stafford||1403||1460||Created Duke of Buckingham, see above
|-
|Earl of Suffolk (1385)||William de la Pole, 4th Earl of Suffolk||1415||1450||See above, Duke of Suffolk
|-
|Earl of Huntingdon (1387)||John Holland, 2nd Earl of Huntingdon||1417||1447||Restored as Duke of Exeter, see above
|-
|rowspan="2"|Earl of Somerset (1397)||John Beaufort, 3rd Earl of Somerset||1418||1444||Duke of Somerset in 1443, see above
|-
|Edmund Beaufort, 4th Earl of Somerset||1444||1455||Duke of Somerset in 1448, see above
|-
|Earl of Westmorland (1397)||Ralph Neville, 2nd Earl of Westmorland||1425||1484||
|-
|Earl of Northumberland (1416)||Henry Percy, 2nd Earl of Northumberland||1416||1455||
|-
|Earl of Shrewsbury (1442)||John Talbot, 1st Earl of Shrewsbury||1442||1453||New creation
|-
|Earl of Kendal (1446)||John de Foix, 1st Earl of Kendal||1446||1462||New creation
|-
|Earl of Wiltshire (1449)||James Butler, 1st Earl of Wiltshire||1449||1461||New creation
|-
|Earl of Worcester (1449)||John Tiptoft, 1st Earl of Worcester||1449||1470||New creation
|-
|Viscount Beaumont (1440)||John Beaumont, 1st Viscount Beaumont||1440||1460||New creation
|-
|Viscount Bourchier (1446)||Henry Bourchier, 1st Viscount Bourchier||1446||1483||New creation
|-
|Baron de Ros (1264)||Thomas de Ros, 10th Baron de Ros||1421||1464||
|-
|Baron Fauconberg (1295)||Joan Neville, 6th Baroness Fauconberg||1429||1490||
|-
|Baron FitzWalter (1295)||Elizabeth Radcliffe, suo jure Baroness FitzWalter||1431||1485||
|-
|Baron FitzWarine (1295)||Thomazine FitzWarine, suo jure Baroness FitzWarine||1433||1471||
|-
|rowspan="2"|Baron Grey de Wilton (1295)||Richard Grey, 6th Baron Grey de Wilton||1396||1442||Died
|-
|Reginald Grey, 7th Baron Grey de Wilton||1442||1493||
|-
|Baron Clinton (1299)||John de Clinton, 5th Baron Clinton||1431||1464||
|-
|Baron De La Warr (1299)||Reginald West, 6th Baron De La Warr||1427||1450||
|-
|Baron Ferrers of Chartley (1299)||William de Ferrers, 7th Baron Ferrers of Chartley||1435||1450||
|-
|Baron Lovel (1299)||William Lovel, 7th Baron Lovel||1414||1455||
|-
|Baron Scales (1299)||Thomas de Scales, 7th Baron Scales||1419||1460||
|-
|Baron Welles (1299)||Lionel de Welles, 6th Baron Welles||1421||1461||
|-
|Baron de Clifford (1299)||Thomas Clifford, 8th Baron de Clifford||1422||1455||
|-
|rowspan="2"|Baron Ferrers of Groby (1299)||William Ferrers, 5th Baron Ferrers of Groby||1388||1445||Died
|-
|Elizabeth Ferrers, 6th Baroness Ferrers of Groby||1445||1483||
|-
|Baron Furnivall (1299)||John Talbot, 6th Baron Furnivall||1407||1453||jure uxoris; created Earl of Shrewsbury in 1442; barony held by his heirs until 1616 when it fell into abeyance
|-
|rowspan="2"|Baron Morley (1299)||Robert de Morley, 6th Baron Morley||1435||1442||Died
|-
|Alianore Lovel, 7th Baroness Morley||1442||1476||
|-
|rowspan="2"|Baron Strange of Knockyn (1299)||Richard le Strange, 7th Baron Strange of Knockyn||1397||1449||Died
|-
|John le Strange, 8th Baron Strange||1449||1470||
|-
|Baron Zouche of Haryngworth (1308)||William la Zouche, 5th Baron Zouche||1415||1463||
|-
|Baron Beaumont (1309)||John Beaumont, 6th Baron Beaumont||1416||1460||Created Viscount Beaumont, Barony held by his heirs until 1507, when it fell into abeyance
|-
|Baron Audley of Heleigh (1313)||James Tuchet, 5th Baron Audley||1408||1459||
|-
|rowspan="2"|Baron Cobham of Kent (1313)||Joan Brooke, 5th Baroness Cobham||1434||1442||Died
|-
|Edward Brooke, 6th Baron Cobham||1442||1464||
|-
|Baron Willoughby de Eresby (1313)||Robert Willoughby, 6th Baron Willoughby de Eresby||1409||1452||
|-
|Baron Dacre (1321)||Thomas Dacre, 6th Baron Dacre||1398||1458||
|-
|Baron FitzHugh (1321)||William FitzHugh, 4th Baron FitzHugh||1425||1452||
|-
|Baron Greystock (1321)||Ralph de Greystock, 5th Baron Greystock||1436||1487||
|-
|rowspan="2"|Baron Grey of Ruthyn (1325)||Reginald Grey, 3rd Baron Grey de Ruthyn||1388||1441||Died
|-
|Edmund Grey, 4th Baron Grey de Ruthyn||1441||1490||
|-
|Baron Harington (1326)||William Harington, 5th Baron Harington||1418||1458||
|-
|Baron Burghersh (1330)||Isabel le Despencer, suo jure Baroness Burgersh||1414||1440||Died; Barony succeeded by the Earl of Warwick, and held by his heirs until 1459 when it fell into abeyance
|-
|rowspan="2"|Baron Poynings (1337)||Robert Poynings, 5th Baron Poynings||1387||1446||Died
|-
|Eleanor Percy, 6th Baroness Poynings||1446||1482||
|-
|Baron Bourchier (1342)||Henry Bourchier, 5th Baron Bourchier||1433||1483||Created Viscount Bourchier, see above
|-
|Baron Scrope of Masham (1350)||John Scrope, 4th Baron Scrope of Masham||1426||1455||
|-
|Baron Botreaux (1368)||William de Botreaux, 3rd Baron Botreaux||1392||1462||
|-
|Baron Scrope of Bolton (1371)||Henry Scrope, 4th Baron Scrope of Bolton||1420||1459||
|-
|Baron Cromwell (1375)||Ralph de Cromwell, 3rd Baron Cromwell||1417||1455||
|-
|rowspan="2"|Baron Bergavenny (1392)||Elizabeth de Beauchamp, suo jure Baroness Bergavenny||1421||1447||Died
|-
|George Nevill, 4th Baron Bergavenny||1447||1492||
|-
|rowspan="2"|Baron Grey of Codnor (1397)||Henry Grey, 3rd Baron Grey of Codnor||1431||1444||Died
|-
|Henry Grey, 4th Baron Grey of Codnor||1444||1496||
|-
|Baron Berkeley (1421)||James Berkeley, 1st Baron Berkeley||1421||1463||
|-
|rowspan="2"|Baron Hungerford (1426)||Walter Hungerford, 1st Baron Hungerford||1426||1449||Died
|-
|Robert Hungerford, 2nd Baron Hungerford||1449||1459||
|-
|rowspan="2"|Baron Tiptoft (1426)||John de Tiptoft, 1st Baron Tiptoft||1426||1443||Died
|-
|John de Tiptoft, 2nd Baron Tiptoft||1443||1470||Created Earl of Worcester in 1449, and held by his heirs until 1485, when Barony fell into abeyance
|-
|Baron Latimer (1432)||George Neville, 1st Baron Latimer||1432||1469||
|-
|Baron Fanhope (1433)||John Cornwall, 1st Baron Fanhope||1433||1443||Created Baron Milbroke in 1442; died, all titles extinct
|-
|Baron Dudley (1440)||John Sutton, 1st Baron Dudley||1440||1487||New creation
|-
|Baron Sudeley (1441)||Ralph Boteler, 1st Baron Sudeley||1441||1473||New creation
|-
|Baron Lisle (1444)||John Talbot, 1st Baron Lisle||1444||1453||New creation
|-
|Baron de Moleyns (1445)||Robert Hungerford, 1st Baron de Moleyns||1445||1461||New creation
|-
|Baron Saye and Sele (1447)||James Fiennes, 1st Baron Saye and Sele||1447||1450||New creation
|-
|Baron Beauchamp of Powick (1447)||John Beauchamp, 1st Baron Beauchamp of Powick||1447||1475||New creation
|-
|Baron Hoo and Hastings (1447)||Thomas Hoo, Baron Hoo and Hastings||1447||1455||New creation
|-
|Baron Rivers (1448)||Richard Woodville, 1st Baron Rivers||1448||1469||New creation
|-
|Baron Stourton (1448)||John Stourton, 1st Baron Stourton||1448||1462||New creation
|-
|Baron Vessy (1449)||Henry Bromflete, 1st Baron Vessy||1449||1469||New creation
|-
|Baron Bonville (1449)||William Bonville, 1st Baron Bonville||1449||1461||New creation
|-
|Baron Egremont (1449)||Thomas Percy, 1st Baron Egremont||1449||1460||New creation
|-
|}

Peerage of Scotland

|Duke of Rothesay (1398)||-||1437||1452||
|-
|Earl of Dunbar (1115)||George II, Earl of March||1420||1457||
|-
|Earl of Lennox (1184)||Isabella, Countess of Lennox||1425||1458||
|-
|rowspan=2|Earl of Ross (1215)||Alexander of Islay, Earl of Ross||1429||1449||Died
|-
|John of Islay, Earl of Ross||1449||1476||
|-
|Earl of Sutherland (1235)||John de Moravia, 7th Earl of Sutherland||1427||1460||
|-
|rowspan=3|Earl of Douglas (1358)||William Douglas, 6th Earl of Douglas||1439||1440||Died
|-
|James Douglas, 7th Earl of Douglas||1440||1443||
|-
|William Douglas, 8th Earl of Douglas||1443||1452||
|-
|Earl of Moray (1372)||Elizabeth Dunbar, 8th Countess of Moray||1429||1455||
|-
|Earl of Orkney (1379)||William Sinclair, Earl of Orkney||1410||1476||Lord Sinclair in 1449
|-
|rowspan=2|Earl of Angus (1389)||James Douglas, 3rd Earl of Angus||1437||1446||Died
|-
|George Douglas, 4th Earl of Angus||1446||1463||
|-
|rowspan=2|Earl of Crawford (1398)||David Lindsay, 3rd Earl of Crawford||1439||1446||Died
|-
|Alexander Lindsay, 4th Earl of Crawford||1446||1453||
|-
|Earl of Menteith (1427)||Malise Graham, 1st Earl of Menteith||1427||1490||
|-
|Earl of Avondale (1437)||James Douglas, 1st Earl of Avondale||1437||1443||Succeeded to the more senior Earldom of Douglas, see above
|-
|Earl of Huntly (1445)||Alexander Gordon, 1st Earl of Huntly||1445||1470||New creation
|-
|Earl of Ormond (1445)||Hugh Douglas, Earl of Ormonde||1445||1455||New creation
|-
|Lord Erskine (1429)||Robert Erskine, 1st Lord Erskine||1429||1453||de jure 12th Earl of Mar
|-
|Lord Hay (1429)||William Hay, 1st Lord Hay||1429||1462||
|-
|Lord Somerville (1430)||William Somerville, 2nd Lord Somerville||1438||1456||
|-
|rowspan=2|Lord Lorne (1439)||Robert Stewart, 1st Lord of Lorne||1439||1449||Died
|-
|John Stewart, 2nd Lord of Lorne||1449||1463||
|-
|rowspan=2|Lord Haliburton of Dirleton (1441)||Walter de Haliburton, 1st Lord Haliburton of Dirleton||1441||1447||New creation; died
|-
|John Haliburton, 2nd Lord Haliburton of Dirleton||1447||1454||
|-
|rowspan=2|Lord Forbes (1442)||Alexander Forbes, 1st Lord Forbes||1442||1448||New creation; died
|-
|James Forbes, 2nd Lord Forbes||1448||1462||
|-
|Lord Crichton (1443)||William Crichton, 1st Lord Crichton||1443||1454||New creation
|-
|Lord Hamilton (1445)||James Hamilton, 1st Lord Hamilton||1445||1479||New creation
|-
|Lord Maxwell (1445)||Herbert Maxwell, 1st Lord Maxwell||1445||1454||New creation
|-
|Lord Glamis (1445)||Patrick Lyon, 1st Lord Glamis||1445||1459||New creation
|-
|Lord Graham (1445)||Patrick Graham, 1st Lord Graham||1445||1466||New creation
|-
|Lord Leslie and Ballinbreich (1445)||George Leslie, 1st Lord Leslie and Ballinbreich||1445||1490||New creation
|-
|Lord Lindsay of the Byres (1445)||Lawrence Abernethy, 1st Lord Saltoun||1445||1460||New creation
|-
|Lord Saltoun (1445)||Lawrence Abernethy, 1st Lord Saltoun||1445||1460||New creation
|-
|Lord Campbell (1445)||Duncan Campbell, 1st Lord Campbell||1445||1453||New creation
|-
|Lord Gray (1445)||Andrew Gray, 1st Lord Gray||1445||1469||New creation
|-
|Lord Montgomerie (1449)||Alexander Montgomerie, 1st Lord Montgomerie||1449||1470||New creation
|-
|}

Peerage of Ireland

|Earl of Ulster (1264)||Richard of York, 8th Earl of Ulster||1425||1460||
|-
|Earl of Kildare (1316)||Thomas FitzGerald, 7th Earl of Kildare||1434||1478||
|-
|Earl of Ormond (1328)||James Butler, 4th Earl of Ormond||1405||1452||
|-
|Earl of Desmond (1329)||James FitzGerald, 6th Earl of Desmond||1420||1463||
|-
|Earl of Waterford (1446)||John Talbot, 1st Earl of Waterford||1446||1453||New creation
|-
|Baron Athenry (1172)||Thomas II de Bermingham||1428||1473||
|-
|Baron Kingsale (1223)||Patrick de Courcy, 11th Baron Kingsale||1430||1460||
|-
|Baron Kerry (1223)||Thomas Fitzmaurice, 8th Baron Kerry||1410||1469||
|-
|Baron Barry (1261)||William Barry, 8th Baron Barry||1420||1480||
|-
|Baron Gormanston (1370)||Christopher Preston, 3rd Baron Gormanston||1422||1450||
|-
|rowspan=2|Baron Slane (1370)||Christopher Fleming, 3rd Baron Slane||1435||1446||Died
|-
|Christopher Fleming, 4th Baron Slane||1446||1457||
|-
|Baron Howth (1425)||Christopher St Lawrence, 2nd Baron Howth||1430||1465||
|-
|Baron Killeen (1449)||Christopher Plunkett, 1st Baron Killeen||1449||1455||New creation
|-
|}

References

 

Lists of peers by decade
1440s in England
1440s in Ireland
15th century in England
15th century in Scotland
15th century in Ireland
15th-century English nobility
15th-century Scottish peers
15th-century Irish people
Peers